Gussie Graham (16 April 1856 – 17 October 1922) was a Scotland international rugby union player.

Rugby union career

Amateur career
Graham played with Edinburgh Academicals.

Provincial career
He was capped by Edinburgh District in 1874.

He played for East of Scotland District in 1876.

He played for the Blues Trial side in 1878.

International career
Graham was capped 10 times for Scotland between 1876 and 1881.

Referee career
He refereed the 1884 inter-city match between Glasgow District and Edinburgh District.

Administrative career
He became the 11th President of the Scottish Rugby Union. He served one year from 1883 to 1884.

References

1856 births
1922 deaths
Scotland international rugby union players
Scottish rugby union players
Rugby union players from Dumfries and Galloway
Edinburgh Academicals rugby union players
Presidents of the Scottish Rugby Union
Blues Trial players
Edinburgh District (rugby union) players
East of Scotland District players
Scottish rugby union referees
Scottish Districts referees